Austin & Pickersgill is a shipbuilding company formed in Sunderland in 1954.

History

Corporate history

Austin & Pickersgill was formed in Sunderland in 1954 by the merger of S.P. Austin & Son Ltd (founded by Samuel Peter Austin in c.1826) and William Pickersgill & Sons Ltd (founded c. 1838). After the merger, Austin's Wear Dock yard was used for repair while shipbuilding was concentrated at Pickersgill's Southwick Yard. The latter was modernised with the introduction of large assembly shops and prefabrication processes. This reduced costs and increased the maximum size of a vessel that the yard could build from 10,000 to 40,000 tons deadweight.

In 1957 a consortium of three companies led by London & Overseas Freighters Ltd. (LOF) took over Austin & Pickersgill. In October 1968 Austin & Pickersgill took over Bartram & Sons Ltd, whose South Dock yard was also in Sunderland. In 1970 London and Overseas Freighters bought out the other members of the consortium to take 100% ownership of Austin & Pickersgill.

In 1977 Austin & Pickersgill was nationalised as a member company of British Shipbuilders. In 1986 the company was  merged with Sunderland Shipbuilders Ltd to form North East Shipbuilders Ltd. However, both the Southwick and the Doxford Pallion Shipbuilding Yards closed in 1988 following negotiations with the European Commission to reduce shipbuilding capacity in the UK.

Ship Production

A&P maximised the competitiveness of its prefabrication process by producing ships to standard designs rather than individual specifications. From 1962 onwards the company offered standard bulk carriers in a range of sizes designated according to tonnage. A&P's most numerous product was another of its standard designs, the SD14 shelter deck cargo ship. During the Second World War, shipyards in the United States had delivered more than 2,700 Liberty ship shelter deck cargo ships. By the 1960s many Liberty ships were reaching the end of their service lives, so in 1965 A&P started to develop a low-cost shelter-deck cargo vessel to replace them.

A&P invited other UK shipbuilders to tender for licences to produce SD14s, but by 1966 only Bartram's could meet A&P's requirement to build each ship to a selling price of £915,000. Both Bartram's and A&P built their first SD14s in 1967 and handed them to their new owners in February 1968. A&P's takeover of Bartram's followed in October.

In 1967 A&P licensed Hellenic Shipyards Co. of Skaramangas in Greece to build twenty SD14s. In 1971 A&P licensed Companhia Comércio e Navegação to build SD14s at Mauá in Brazil.

In 1973 Robb Caledon Shipbuilding of Dundee in Scotland contracted to build three SD14s. Astilleros y Fábricas Navales del Estado also obtained permission to build six SD14s in its yard at Ensenada in Argentina.

By the time production ceased, 211 SD14s had been built either at A&P's Southwick and South Dock yards and or by licensees in Greece, Brazil, Scotland and Argentina. The largest volume of sales was to Greek shipowners. The SD14 and B-series standard ship designs, and the prefabrication methods by which they were built enabled A&P to maintain a full order book until nationalisation in 1977, in contrast to many other UK shipbuilders in that era.

See also
 List of shipbuilders and shipyards

References

Further reading
 
 
 
For details of the company archives see Tyne & Wear Archives Service

Engineering companies of England
British Shipbuilders
Shipbuilding companies of the City of Sunderland
1954 establishments in England